Head is an English surname. Notable people with the surname include:

 Alicia Esteve Head (born 1973), Spanish impostor
 Anthony Head (born 1954), English actor and musician
 Antony Head, 1st Viscount Head (1906–1983), British politician and diplomat 
 Barclay V. Head (1844–1914), British numismatist
 Bessie Head (1937–1986), South African novelist
 Daisy Head (born 1991), English actress
 David Head (born 1984), American author and winner of the George Washington Book Prize
 Don Head (ice hockey) (born 1933), Canadian ice hockey player
 Don Head (public servant), Canadian public servant
 Edith Head (1897–1981), American costume designer
 Emily Head (born 1988), English actress
 Francis Bond Head (1793–1875), British army officer
 Frederick Head (1874–1941), British-Australian Anglican archbishop
 George Head (1782–1855), British army officer
 George Head Head (c.1795–1876), British lawyer and banker
 Hannah Head (1941–2011), British train driver
 Henry Head (1861–1940), English neurologist
 Howard Head (1914–1991), American aeronautical engineer and inventor
 Jae Head (born 1996), American actor
 Joanne Head (1930–2021), American politician
 John Head (musician), English musician
 John Head (Gloucester MP) (died 1391), English politician
 John Head (Stockbridge MP) (c.1656–1711), English politician
 John L. Head (1915–1980), American basketball coach
 Lesley Head, Australian geographer
 Louis Head (born 1990), American baseball player
 Luther Head (born 1982), American basketball player
 Murray Head (born 1946), British actor and singer
 Nathan Head (born 1980), British actor
 Patrick Head (born 1945), English motorsport personality
 Paul Head (born 1965), English hammer thrower
 Richard Head (disambiguation), multiple people
 Richard Head (c. 1637–1686), author and playwright
 Sara Head (born 1980), Welsh table tennis player
 Stacy Head (born 1969), American lawyer and politician 
 Stephen Head (born 1984), American baseball player and scout 
 T. Grady Head (1897–1965), Associate Justice of the Supreme Court of Georgia
 Thomas Head (1714–1779), English sheriff
 Travis Head (born 1993), Australian cricketer
 William K. Head (born 1947), American football coach
 William O. Head (1859–1931), American mayor 

English-language surnames